Paweł Słowiok (born March 31, 1992 in Cieszyn, Poland) is a retired Polish Nordic combined skier. He won the Gundersen (2 jumps, 15 km cross country) in the Youth Winter Olympic Festival 2009 in Szczyrk. He did also came at the second place in the Sprint (1 jump, 7,5 km cross country). He has also competed in the World Cup.

References

External links
www.pawelslowiok.blogspot.com

1992 births
Living people
People from Cieszyn
Polish male Nordic combined skiers
Sportspeople from Silesian Voivodeship
Universiade medalists in nordic combined
Nordic combined skiers at the 2018 Winter Olympics
Olympic Nordic combined skiers of Poland
Universiade gold medalists for Poland
Universiade bronze medalists for Poland
Competitors at the 2013 Winter Universiade
Competitors at the 2015 Winter Universiade